Acanthinus is a genus of antlike flower beetles in the family Anthicidae. There are more than 30 described species in Acanthinus.

Species
These 38 species belong to the genus Acanthinus:

 Acanthinus acutus Werner
 Acanthinus aequinoctialis (LaFerté-Sénectère, 1849)
 Acanthinus argentinus (Argentine anthicid)
 Acanthinus bordoni Werner
 Acanthinus browni Werner
 Acanthinus ceibensis Werner
 Acanthinus chalumeaui Bonadona, 1981
 Acanthinus clavicornis (Champion, 1890)
 Acanthinus continuus Werner
 Acanthinus dromedarius (LaFerté-Sénectère, 1849)
 Acanthinus elegantulus Werner
 Acanthinus exilis (LaFerté-Sénectère, 1849)
 Acanthinus fairchildi Werner
 Acanthinus fastigatus Werner
 Acanthinus formiciformis Werner
 Acanthinus fucosus Werner
 Acanthinus geijskesi Werner
 Acanthinus glareosus Werner, 1966
 Acanthinus harringtoni Werner
 Acanthinus imitans Werner
 Acanthinus invitus Werner
 Acanthinus kraussi Werner
 Acanthinus laevithorax Werner
 Acanthinus lanceatus Werner
 Acanthinus myrmecops (Casey, 1895)
 Acanthinus nevermanni Werner
 Acanthinus parianae Werner
 Acanthinus pilositibia Werner
 Acanthinus quinquemaculatus (LaFerté-Sénectère, 1849)
 Acanthinus rohweri Werner
 Acanthinus schwarzi Werner
 Acanthinus scitulus (LeConte, 1852)
 Acanthinus simplicisternum Werner
 Acanthinus spinicollis (LaFerté-Sénectère, 1849)
 Acanthinus trifasciatus (Fabricius, 1801)
 Acanthinus umbilicatus Chandler
 Acanthinus veracruzensis Werner
 Acanthinus zeteki Werner

References

Further reading

 
 
 

Anthicidae
Articles created by Qbugbot